Austrocordulia leonardi is a species of dragonfly in the family Austrocorduliidae, 
commonly known as the Sydney hawk. 
It is a medium-sized black and yellow dragonfly, endemic to the Sydney Basin, New South Wales, Australia,
where its natural habitat is rivers and dams.

Austrocordulia leonardi is threatened by habitat loss.

Gallery

Note
There is uncertainty about which family Austrocordulia leonardi best belongs to: Austrocorduliidae, Synthemistidae, or Corduliidae.

See also
 List of Odonata species of Australia

References

Austrocorduliidae
Corduliidae
Synthemistidae
Critically endangered fauna of Australia
Critically endangered insects
Odonata of Australia
Endemic fauna of Australia
Taxa named by Günther Theischinger
Insects described in 1973
Taxonomy articles created by Polbot